Sun Yueyang (born 27 June 2000) is a Chinese racing driver last competed in the 2018 BRDC British Formula 3 Championship with Carlin. He was part of the Renault Sport Academy between 2016 and 2018.

Karting record

Karting career summary

Racing record

Racing career summary 

‡ Yueyang was ineligible for points from the second round onwards.

Complete Formula Renault Eurocup results
(key) (Races in bold indicate pole position) (Races in italics indicate fastest lap)

Complete BRDC British Formula 3 Championship results 
(key) (Races in bold indicate pole position; races in italics indicate fastest lap)

References

External links 

 

Living people
2000 births
Chinese racing drivers
Formula Renault Eurocup drivers
BRDC British Formula 3 Championship drivers
JD Motorsport drivers
Carlin racing drivers
Formula Renault 2.0 NEC drivers
Karting World Championship drivers
UAE F4 Championship drivers